The 1997 Primera B season was the 46th completed season of the Primera B de Chile.

Torneo Apertura

Everton became the tournament’s champion after beating Rangers in the tie-breaker final.

Torneo Clausura

Deportes Iquique was tournament’s champion.

Annual table

References

External links
 RSSSF 1997

Primera B de Chile seasons
Primera B